Lophorhinus is an extinct genus of biarmosuchian therapsids from the Late Permian of South Africa. The type species L. willodenensis was named in 2007. It is known from the anterior half of a skull.

References

Burnetiamorphs
Prehistoric therapsid genera
Lopingian synapsids of Africa
Fossil taxa described in 2007
Taxa named by Christian Sidor
Lopingian genus first appearances
Lopingian genus extinctions